Jon Carroll (born November 6, 1943) was a columnist for the San Francisco Chronicle from 1982, when he succeeded columnist Charles McCabe, to 2015, when he retired. His column appeared on the back page of the Chronicles Datebook section (the newspaper's entertainment section) Tuesdays through Fridays. Locally, he was best known for his liberal politics and his odd, self-referential humor.

Carroll was born in Los Angeles and raised in nearby Pasadena. He attended (but did not finish) UC Berkeley, where he edited the campus humor magazine, the California Pelican. Before becoming a newspaper columnist, he worked on the editorial staff at Rolling Stone magazine (assistant editor, 1970) where he wrote "Voice Denies Nixon Drug Use," Rags magazine,  Oui, a Playboy spinoff (editor, 1972); The Village Voice (West Coast editor, 1974); WomenSports magazine (Consulting editor); and New West magazine (editor, 1978, where he won a National Magazine Award in 1979).

On Friday, October 30, 2015, Carroll wrote: "Yes, it's true; I'm retiring. Thirty-three years is a long time to do anything, and 8,700 columns is, well, a lot of columns. I haven't exactly had to wait my turn... My last column is Nov. 20..."

Personal life
Carroll lives in Oakland, with his wife, author Tracy Johnston. He was previously married to Sandra Rosenzweig, with whom he has two daughters, Rachel and Shana Carroll. Shana is a trapeze artist and cofounder of the performance troup The 7 Fingers.

References

External links
 Archive of columns
 Media Conference Host at The WELL
 Jon Carroll on creativity, an interview with about-creativity.com May 18, 2007 
 Carroll's column on the "Unitarian Jihad"
 Long interview with Jon Carroll on The Rumpus
 Jon Carroll blog

Living people
Writers from Los Angeles
San Francisco Chronicle people
Writers from the San Francisco Bay Area
1943 births
American male journalists
20th-century American journalists
21st-century American journalists
American columnists
20th-century American male writers
21st-century American male writers